are a Japanese football club, based in Tottori, capital of Tottori Prefecture. They play in the J3 League, the Japanese third tier of professional football league. Their team colour is green.

Name origin
Their team name Gainare derives from the Tottori dialect word gaina meaning "great" and Italian sperare meaning "to hope".

Their team mascot was a Japanese horror anime character Ge Ge Ge no Kitaro created by Shigeru Mizuki, a native of Sakaiminato, Tottori.

History
The club was founded in 1983 as Tottori Teachers' Soccer Club (鳥取教員団サッカー部　Tottori Kyōin Dan Sakkā Bu). They opened their gate to players with other professions in 1989, renaming themselves S.C. Tottori. They adopted their current name in 2007.

They were promoted to the Japan Football League after finishing runners-up in the 2001 Regional League play-off. Nonprofit organisation Yamatsumi Sports Club operate the club.

After defeating Arte Takasaki 1–0 on October 3, 2010 in their home stadium, at last they could secure JFL top four after failed attempts on two previous seasons. The confirmation from J. League about their promotion to J2 came on November 29. They won the JFL title on October 24, 2010 with five games remaining.

On the 2013 J2–J3 promotion/relegation playoff, Gainare Tottori lost by 2–1 to Kamatamare Sanuki on aggregate score, and ended up relegated to the newly-launched J3 League (from now on the 3rd tier of professional league football) ahead of the 2014 season. The club spent three seasons at the J2 League, and has not returned since their relegation.

Stadiums
They play their home games mainly at Axis Bird Stadium in Tottori City. Tottori Soccer Stadium is the only stadium in San'in region that meets the J. League requirements. 

In recent years, they also play some games at Fuse Athletic Park Stadium in Tottori City, Matsue Athletics Stadium in Matsue, Shimane Prefecture and Hamayama Athletic Park Stadium in Izumo, Shimane Prefecture.

League and cup records

Key

Honours
 Japan Football League
 Champions (1): 2010

Current squad
As of 3 February 2023.

Out on loan

Coaching Staff
For the 2023 season.

Managerial history

Kit evolution

References

External links
(Japanese) Official Website

 
Football clubs in Japan
Association football clubs established in 1983
Sport in Tottori Prefecture
J.League clubs
1983 establishments in Japan
Japan Football League clubs